The 2022 Missouri Valley Football Conference football season is the 37th season of college football play for the Missouri Valley Football Conference and part of the 2022 NCAA Division I FCS football season. This is the MVFC's 3rd straight season with 11 teams, and will be the last as the conference will add a 12th team for the 2023 season.

South Dakota State and North Dakota State met in the National Championship Game after winning all three of their home playoff games. It was only the second time in FCS history and MVFC history that the final game was played between two same-conference teams, the last one pitting North Dakota State and Illinois State against each other in 2015. The Jackrabbits would go on to win their first National Title, 45-21.

Previous season
In 2021, North Dakota State won the conference and received the automatic bid to the 2021 playoffs. They would go on to win the FCS Championship Game to win their 9th title in 11 years.

Besides NDSU; Southern Illinois, South Dakota, Northern Iowa, South Dakota State, and Missouri State made the playoffs. Southern Illinois and South Dakota faced off in the first round, SIU was victorious but lost to NDSU the next week. Northern Iowa played Eastern Washington in the first round, but they lost 19-9. SDSU beat UC Davis in the first round, beat 4th seeded Sacramento State in the second round, and 5th seeded Villanova in the quarterfinals. Their run ended in the semifinal, when the Jacks lost to 8th seeded Montana State. Missouri State lost to UT Martin in the opening round.

Coaching changes

Western Illinois
On December 17, 2021, Myers Hendrickson was named the new head coach at Western Illinois. Hendrickson played for the Leathernecks in his brief college career as a wide receiver from 2008-10. He replaces coach Jared Elliot who led the program since 2018.

Preseason

MVFC Media Day

Preseason Poll
The annual preseason poll; voted on by conference coaches, athletic directors, and media members.

Preseason Awards

Individual awards

Rankings

Schedule

All times Central time.

† denotes Homecoming game
^ denotes AP Poll ranking for FBS teams

Regular season schedule

Week 1

Week 2

Week 3

Week 4

Week 5

Week 6

Week 7

Week 8

Week 9

Week 10

Week 11

Week 12

Postseason

In 2022, three teams made the FCS Playoffs. South Dakota State (No. 1) and North Dakota State (No. 3) both received byes, while North Dakota was unseeded and played in the opening round. Below are the games in which they played.

All times Central time.
Tournament seedings in parenthesis

First round

Second round

Quarterfinals

Semifinals

National Championship

MVFC records vs other conferences
2022-23 records against non-conference foes (through December 17, 2022):

Post Season

Source:

Awards and honors

Player of the week honors

In Week 12, an Offensive Lineman was also named to the player of the week honors, Nash Jensen of North Dakota State.

Players of the Year
On November 28, 2022, the Missouri Valley Football Conference released their Players of the Year and All-Conference Honors.

Offensive Player of the Year
 Jaleel McLaughlin, RB (Sr - Youngstown State)

Defensive Player of the Year
 Zeke Vandenburg, LB (Sr - Illinois State)

Newcomer of the Year
 Naseim Brantley, WR (Jr - Western Illinois)

Freshman of the Year
 Cade Chambers, QB (Fr - Indiana State)

Coach of the Year
 John Stiegelmeier (South Dakota State)

All-Conference Teams

All-Newcomer Team

Source:

National Awards
On December 5, 2022, STATS Perform released their list of finalists for the Walter Payton Award, Buck Buchanan Award, and the Jerry Rice Award, respectively.

Walter Payton Award
The Walter Payton Award is given to the best FCS offensive player. Here are the MVFC finalists:

 Jaleel McLaughlin (RB - Youngstown State)
 Cody Mauch (OL - North Dakota State)
 Hunter Luepke (FB - North Dakota State)

Buck Buchanan Award
The Buck Buchanan Award is given to the best FCS defensive player. The MVFC’s own Zeke Vandenburg (LB - Illinois State) won the award, and was honored at the National Championship game in January.Here are the other MVFC finalists:

 Spencer Waege (DL - North Dakota State)
 Caleb Sanders (DL - South Dakota State)

Jerry Rice Award
The Jerry Rice Award is given to the best FCS freshman player. Here are the MVFC finalists:

 Cade Chambers (QB - Indiana State)

All-Americans

Home attendance

Bold - Exceed capacity
†Season High
‡FCS Playoff Game

2023 NFL Draft

The following list includes all MVFC players who were drafted in the 2023 NFL Draft.

Head coaches
Through January 10, 2023

References

 
2022 Missouri Valley Football Conference season